Blond is a surname. Notable people with the surname include:

Phillip Blond (born 1966), director of the UK think tank ResPublica
Shelley Blond (born 1970), first voice actress for Lara Croft
Susan Blond (born 1949), American publicist

See also
Bland (surname)